"Pam" is a song by American singer Justin Quiles, Puerto Rican rapper Daddy Yankee, and Dominican rapper El Alfa. The single reached a peak position of 33 on the Billboard Hot Latin Songs chart.

Music video 
The music video, which was directed by JP Valencia and produced by 36 Grados between Puerto Rico and Colombia, and has surpassed 60 million views.

Charts

Weekly charts

Year-end charts

Certifications

References 

2020 songs
2020 singles
Justin Quiles songs
Daddy Yankee songs
Songs written by Daddy Yankee
Spanish-language songs
Songs written by Dimelo Flow
Songs written by Justin Quiles
El Alfa songs